Stonehall and Lydden Halt railway station served the village of Lydden, Kent, England, from 1914 to 1954 on the Chatham Main Line.

History
The station was opened to the public in June 1914 by the London, Chatham and Dover Railway, although it was used earlier by miners and workmen on 1 January 1914 and used for the Temple Ewell Parish Council meeting on 30 March 1914. It was known as Lydden Halt around this time. It closed on 5 April 1954, although it was used by staff going to Dover on 17 June 1957, when it was known as Stonehall.

References

Disused railway stations in Kent
Railway stations in Great Britain opened in 1914
Railway stations in Great Britain closed in 1954
1914 establishments in England
1954 disestablishments in England